The Special Ones (subtitled The Best Of) is the first greatest hits album by Australian singer songwriter, Missy Higgins. The album includes tracks from Higgins' five studio albums as well as three new unreleased tracks and the previously unreleased demo of "All for Believing" she submitted to Triple J Unearthed competition in 2001. The Special Ones was released on 23 November 2018.

Upon release, Higgins explained The Special Ones saying "Usually, they're the ones that get the biggest reaction at gigs, the ones that most connect with people, the ones that seem to have touched on some universal truth. They're the hooky ones you can sing out loud in the shower while no one's watching and imagine you're in a stadium. But some are special for other reasons. They're the ones that unexpectedly squeeze at your heart. They move you in a way you find hard to articulate, they roll to the rhythm of some internal beat you knew was there but couldn't quite express. This album tries to balance these two types of special."

The album will be supported by the national Coming Home Tour, commencing in January 2019.

Reception
Jeff Jenkins from Stack Magazine said "Missy Higgins' career hasn’t been long.. but her body of work, as exhibited on this first best-of, shows that she might be the finest female singer-songwriter Australia has produced."

Track listing

Charts

Weekly charts

Year-end charts

Release history

References

2018 greatest hits albums
Compilation albums by Australian artists
Eleven: A Music Company albums
Missy Higgins albums